Parachute Training School may mean:
 Parachute Training School (Australian Army), adjacent to HMAS Albatross, Nowra, New South Wales, Australia
 No. 1 Parachute Training School RAF, in England, initially based at RAF Ringway (which is now Manchester Airport) and currently based at RAF Brize Norton
 Parachute Training School (Pakistan Army), Pakistan Army's Para Training School located at Peshawar